= Zajaris Fernández =

Cuban actress and comedian

- Born: 1985 (approximately); Cuba
- Occupations: Actress, Comedian
- Years active: 2001–present

Zajaris Fernández (born 1985 in Cuba) is a Cuban actress and comedian best known for her work in Cuban television, theater, and film. She rose to prominence through her participation in the comedy show "Alegrías de Sobremesa and her roles in several television series, including ¿Jura decir la verdad? (2001).

== Early life and career ==
Zajaris Fernández began her career in Cuban television in the early 2000s. She quickly became a beloved figure in Cuban entertainment thanks to her versatility as an actress and comedian. Over the years, she has been involved in a wide variety of projects, from comedy to drama.

== Filmography ==
- Alegrías de Sobremesa (2001–2017) – A comedy-musical program that became a staple of Cuban television during its run.
- ¿Jura decir la verdad? (2001) – A Cuban comedy program where Zajaris portrayed various characters, including Lissette Tamaño del Busto.
- Mi robot sexual (2019) – A Cuban film in which Zajaris played a key role.
- El show de Alexis Valdés (2020) – A Cuban variety show where Zajaris showcased her comedic talent.
- Al compás del Son (2018) – A Cuban telenovela in which Zajaris played a prominent role, known for its musical and dramatic elements.

== Personal life ==
In 2017, Zajaris was diagnosed with a brain tumor. Therefore, she recently gave an interview to Destino Talk, in which she revealed how this difficult process has been for her and her family. However, she also shows us how, instead of letting this illness break her down, she decided to stay strong; learning to cope with it without stopping enjoying life.
